The Mabry–Hazen House is a historic home located on an  site at 1711 Dandridge Avenue in Knoxville, Tennessee, at the crest of Mabry's Hill.  Also known as the Evelyn Hazen House or the Joseph Alexander Mabry Jr. House, when constructed in 1858 for Joseph Alexander Mabry II it was named Pine Hill Cottage.  The house was in what was then the separate town of East Knoxville.  Stylistically, the house exhibits both Italianate and Greek Revival elements.  Additions in 1886 increased the size of the first floor.  Having operated as a museum since the death of Evelyn Hazen, the house retains its original furniture and family collections, including antique china and crystal with over 2,000 original artifacts on display making it the largest original family collection within America.  The house is listed on the National Register of Historic Places.

At the outset of the American Civil War, Joseph Mabry II, a wealthy Knoxville merchant and importer, pledged $100,000.00 to outfit an entire regiment of Confederate soldiers.  Because of this assistance to the cause, he was given the honorary title of General in the Confederate army.  During the course of the war, both Union and Confederate forces occupied the strategic site of his house adjacent to Fort Hill.  Confederate General Felix Zollicoffer set up his headquarters in the house in 1861, but it was Union forces who had the greatest impact when they fortified the grounds as part of their Knoxville defenses after later taking control of Knoxville.

After Mabry's death in 1882, his daughter Alice Evelyn Mabry and her husband Rush Strong Hazen resided in the house. Their youngest daughter, Evelyn Hazen, later occupied the house alone (except for many pet dogs and cats) for many years until her death in 1987.  Her will stipulated that the house had either to become a museum or be razed to the ground. The house opened as a museum in 1992.

Cemetery 
Knoxville's Confederate Cemetery, also known as Bethel Cemetery, located at 1917 Bethel Avenue, occupies  near the house, and is owned by the same museum foundation. It contains the graves of approximately 1,600 Confederate soldiers, 50–60 Union men (prisoners) and 20 veterans. The cemetery property includes a frame caretaker's house, built circa 1881, known as the Winstead Mansion.

In literature 
Three generations of the occupants of the Mabry–Hazen House have been referenced in literary works.  In Life on the Mississippi, Mark Twain wrote about the gunfight that killed the home's builder Joseph Mabry II, and his son, Joseph III (known as Joseph Jr.).  Mabry's daughter married Rush Strong Hazen, a benefactor to Leonora Whitaker Wood, whose life was fictionalized in the novel, Christy.  In 2007, author Jane Van Ryan published The Seduction of Miss Evelyn Hazen, a book chronicling the sensational lawsuit between Knoxville socialite Evelyn Hazen, granddaughter of General Mabry, and Ralph Scharringhaus, to whom she was once engaged.

References
 Knoxville: Fifty Landmarks. (Knoxville: The Knoxville Heritage Committee of the Junior League of Knoxville, 1976), page 19.
 Marshall, Catherine.  Christy. (Chosen Books, 1967).
 The Future of Knoxville's Past: Historic and Architectural Resources in Knoxville, Tennessee.  (Knoxville Historic Zoning Commission, October, 2006), page 19.
 Twain, Mark.  Life on the Mississippi. (Oxford Press, 1996), Chapter 40.
 Van Ryan, Jane.  The Seduction of Miss Evelyn Hazen.  (Glen Echo Publishers, 2006)

Notes

External links
 Mabry–Hazen House & Museum
 Mabry–Hazen News, a blog series mainly by Jane Van Ryan, continuing the stories of the past residents of the Mabry–Hazen House.
 City of Knoxville History
 Knoxville Civil War Sites
 State of Tennessee: East Tennessee Civil War Sites

Houses on the National Register of Historic Places in Tennessee
Houses in Knoxville, Tennessee
Tennessee in the American Civil War
Cemeteries in Tennessee
Military monuments and memorials in the United States
Houses completed in 1858
Confederate States of America monuments and memorials in Tennessee
Historic house museums in Tennessee
Museums in Knoxville, Tennessee
National Register of Historic Places in Knoxville, Tennessee